The 1990–91 Fulham RLFC season was the eleventh in the club's history. They competed in the 1990–91 Second Division of the Rugby Football League. They also competed in the 1991 Challenge Cup, 1990–91 Lancashire Cup and the 1990–91 League Cup. They finished the season in 7th place in the second tier of British professional rugby league.

Second Division Final Standings

References

External links
Rugby League Project

London Broncos seasons
London Broncos season
1990 in rugby league by club
1990 in English rugby league
London Broncos season
1991 in rugby league by club
1991 in English rugby league